Melissa Barak (born August 9, 1979 in Los Angeles) is a choreographer and ballerina.  Since 2006 she has danced with the Los Angeles Ballet and with Morphoses/The Wheeldon Company, formerly having danced for New York City Ballet.

Dance career
Barak began her studies in Santa Monica at Westside School of Ballet with Yvonne Mounsey, Rosemary Valaire, and Nader Hamed.  She then moved to New York City in 1996 to attend City Ballet's affiliate, the School of American Ballet, where she originated a role in Christopher Wheeldon's Soiree Musicale in the 1998 Annual Workshop.  She danced with City Ballet for nine years.

She was named one of "25 to Watch" in 2002 by Dance Magazine.

Featured roles

George Balanchine 
 Cortège Hongrois
 The Four Temperaments
 The Nutcracker
 A Midsummer Night's Dream

Peter Martins 
 The Sleeping Beauty
 Swan Lake

Christopher Wheeldon 
 Carnival of the Animals

Originated corps roles

Eliot Feld 
 Organon

Peter Martins 
 Chichester Psalms

Richard Tanner 
 Soirée

Christopher Wheeldon 
 An American in Paris
 Klavier
 Mercurial Manoeuvres

Choreographic career
Having danced with the New York City Ballet, Barak's work shows influence from George Balanchine.  It was at the City Ballet that Barak's work was first noticed by Peter Martins when she was eighteen years old.  He commissioned a piece from her for the School of American Ballet in 2001.  Barak founded the company Barak Ballet.

Choreography

NYCB 
 Telemann Overture Suite in E Minor, January 6, 2002.

School of American Ballet Annual Workshop 
 Telemann Overture Suite in E Minor, June 2001

Diamond Project 
 If by Chance, June 4, 2002

Honors 
 Choo-San Goh Award for Choreography, 2001

References

1979 births
American ballerinas
Los Angeles Ballet dancers
Morphoses dancers
New York City Ballet dancers
Mae L. Wien Young Choreographer Award recipients
Choreographers of New York City Ballet
Melissa Barak
Living people
School of American Ballet alumni